|}

The Prix Greffulhe is a Group 2 flat horse race in France open to three-year-old horses. It is run over a distance of 2,000 metres (about 1¼ miles) at Saint-Cloud in May.

History
The event is named in memory of Henri Greffulhe (1815–1879), a long-serving member of the Société d'Encouragement. It was established in 1882, and was originally run at Longchamp over 2,100 metres.

The Prix Greffulhe was one of several trials for the Prix du Jockey Club collectively known as the Poules des Produits. The others (listed by their modern titles) were the Prix Daru, the Prix Lupin, the Prix Hocquart and the Prix Noailles. The Prix Greffulhe was restricted to the produce of mares born and bred in France. It was funded by entries submitted before a horse's birth, in the year of conception.

The race was abandoned throughout World War I, with no running from 1915 to 1919. It was contested at Le Tremblay over 2,150 metres from 1943 to 1945.

The Prix Greffulhe was transferred to Saint-Cloud and shortened to 2,000 metres in 2005.

Twenty-three winners of the Prix Greffulhe have achieved victory in the Prix du Jockey Club. The first was Gospodar in 1894, and the most recent was Study of Man in 2018. Two winners, Sea Bird (1965) and Pour Moi (2011), subsequently won The Derby.

The Prix Greffulhe was previously restricted to colts and fillies. It was opened to geldings from the 2020 running.

Records
Leading jockey (6 wins):
 Stéphane Pasquier - Vatori (2005), Ice Blue (2010), Study Of Man (2018), Gold Trip (2020), Baby Rider (2021), Onesto (2022)

Leading trainer (13 wins):
 André Fabre – Along All (1989), Apple Tree (1992), Hunting Hawk (1993), Diamond Mix (1995), Peintre Celebre (1997), Visindar (2006), Quest for Honor (2007), Prospect Wells (2008), Cutlass Bay (2009), Pour Moi (2011), Ocovango (2013), Cloth Of Stars (2016), Roman Candle (2019)

Leading owner (7 wins):
 Marcel Boussac – Asterus (1926), Tourbillon (1931), Cillas (1938), Ardan (1944), Ambiorix (1949), Scratch (1950), Dankaro (1974)
 HH Aga Khan IV – Hafiz (1955), Naasiri (1978), Darshaan (1984), Mouktar (1985), Dalakhani (2003), Visindar (2006), Kesampour (2012)

Winners since 1979

Earlier winners

 1882: Clio
 1883: Farfadet
 1884: Serge
 1885: Palamede
 1886: Sauterelle
 1887: Brio
 1888: Bocage
 1889: Chopine
 1890: Cerbere
 1891: Reverend
 1892: Fra Angelico
 1893: Arkansas
 1894: Gospodar
 1895: Le Sagittaire
 1896: Montreuil
 1897: Palmiste
 1898: Le Roi Soleil
 1899: Tapis Vert
 1900: Cymbalier
 1901: Passaro
 1902: Maximum
 1903: Chatte Blanche
 1904: Monsieur Charvet
 1905: Genial
 1906: Brisecoeur
 1907: Kalisz
 1908: Kenilworth
 1909: Union
 1910: Nuage
 1911: Combourg
 1912: Patrick
 1913: Nimbus
 1914: Diderot
 1915–19: no race
 1920: Flowershop
 1921: Tacite
 1922: Kefalin
 1923: Checkmate
 1924: Tapin / Nethou *
 1925: Belfonds
 1926: Asterus
 1927: Lusignan
 1928: Ivanoe
 1929: Verdi
 1930: Veloucreme
 1931: Tourbillon
 1932: Sagace
 1933: Antenor
 1934: Maravedis
 1935: Mansur
 1936: Fastnet
 1937: Samy
 1938: Cillas
 1939: Bacchus
 1940: Tresor
 1941: Le Pacha
 1942: Arcot
 1943: Pensbury
 1944: Ardan
 1945: Mistral
 1946: Prince Chevalier
 1947: Chesterfield
 1948: Rigolo
 1949: Ambiorix
 1950: Scratch
 1951: Sicambre
 1952: Silnet
 1953: Marly Knowe
 1954: Major
 1955: Hafiz
 1956: Patras
 1957: Amber
 1958: Upstart
 1959: Herbager
 1960: Hautain
 1961: Devon
 1962: Whippoorwill
 1963: Le Mesnil
 1964: Free Ride
 1965: Sea Bird
 1966: Hauban
 1967: Roi Dagobert
 1968: Val d'Aoste
 1969: Prince Regent
 1970: Magic Hope
 1971: Rheffic
 1972: Sancy
 1973: Roi Lear

* The 1924 race was a dead-heat and has joint winners.

See also
 List of French flat horse races

References

 France Galop / Racing Post:
 galop.courses-france.com:
 1882–1889, 1890–1919, 1920–1949, 1950–1979, 1980–present
 france-galop.com – A Brief History: Prix Greffulhe.
 galopp-sieger.de – Prix Greffulhe.
 ifhaonline.org – International Federation of Horseracing Authorities – Prix Greffulhe (2019).
 pedigreequery.com – Prix Greffulhe.

Flat horse races for three-year-olds
Saint-Cloud Racecourse
Horse races in France
1882 establishments in France
Recurring sporting events established in 1882